Wardaman may refer to:
 Wardaman people, an indigenous group of Australia
 Wardaman language, the language isolate spoken by them